The East Slovak Museum in Košice, Slovakia, is one of the oldest Slovak museums, founded in 1872. It is located in the Old Town borough of Košice, at Námestie maratóncov (Marathon Runners' Square).

The museum was founded on 25 June 1876 as Felső-Magyarországi Muzeum (Museum of Upper Hungary), in the Kingdom of Hungary. In 1906, it was renamed to Felső-magyarországi Rákóczi Múzeum after the reburial of Francis II Rákóczi.

A neo-Renaissance building was erected in the early 20th century. It was the first building in the town designed to serve its needs as a museum. There are sculptures of Perseus and Vulcan on the facade of the building.

The museum also possesses a relocated wooden church that was built in 1741.

Exhibits
The main museum building is located at Marathon Runners' Square in central Košice, just outside the Old Town's traditional northern boundary. It serves as the headquarters of the institution, housing several permanent exhibits. It also features a great number of exhibition spaces for temporary exhibits pertaining to history, archaeology, fine arts, historical photography, biology and nature, and other related topics. Temporary exhibitions in the museum tend to last several weeks or even months.

The current number of permanent exhibitions in the main museum underwent a general overhaul in the early-to-mid 2010s, during the main museum building's biggest maintenance renovation in its history. The renovation lasted from September 2008 to September 2013.

In addition to the main museum building, the museum has further branch exhibits in other parts of the Old Town borough, such as the permanent exhibits on nearby Hviezdoslavova Street, the permanent exhibits on Pri Miklušovej väznici and Stará Baštová streets, the specialised exhibition spaces on Hrnčiarska Street, and others.

The following sections provide an overview of the museum's main exhibits, both current and former.

Current exhibits 

Exhibits and exhibition spaces currently operated by the museum.

Former exhibits 

Major exhibits and exhibition spaces operated by the museum in the past. No longer in existence, administered by different museums in the present or developed into separate museums. Listed in rough chronological order, based on date of founding.

Gallery 

Main building (exterior and interior views)

Wooden church of St. Nicholas and belfry (museum park)

Archaeological collections

Period furniture collections

Art history exhibit (Hviezdoslavova Street)

Natural history exhibit (Hviezdoslavova Street)

Fortifications exhibit, Rodošto memorial house and House of Crafts

See also 
 Slovak Technical Museum (Main Street, Košice Old Town)
 East Slovak Gallery (Main Street, Košice Old Town)

References

External links

 Official website
 Articles on The East Slovak Museum — Cassovia.sk
 The East Slovak Museum — Muzeum.sk

Museums in Košice
History museums in Slovakia
Art museums and galleries in Slovakia
Natural history museums in Slovakia
Museums established in 1872
20th-century architecture in Slovakia
Renaissance Revival architecture in Slovakia